The Blackcastle Rings are earthworks and a promontory fort in the Parish of Greenlaw, above the left bank of the Blackadder Water, in the Scottish Borders area of Scotland.

See also
List of hill forts in Scotland
List of places in the Scottish Borders
List of places in Scotland

External links
RCAHMS record on the Blackcastle Rings
CANMORE/RCAHMS record for Broomhill Black Dyke, opposite the Blackcastle Rings
Notes on Berwickshire Forts
Gazetteer for Scotland: Old County of Berwickshire - Blackcastle Rings
GENUKI: Berwickshire Gazetteer - B
GEOGRAPH image: Blackcastle Rings earthwork
GEOGRAPH image: Deil's Neuk (Blackcastle Rings)
Berwickshire Communities Online

Archaeological sites in the Scottish Borders
Scheduled Ancient Monuments in the Scottish Borders